Anda Perianu (born July 4, 1980) is a Romanian former professional tennis player.

On 24 July 2006, she reached her highest WTA singles ranking of 120 whilst her best WTA doubles ranking was 213 on 22 May 2006.

She was coached by Silviu Tănăsoiu.

ITF Circuit finals

Singles: 14 (3 titles, 11 runner-ups)

Doubles: 7 (5 titles, 2 runner-ups)

External links
 
 

1980 births
Living people
Romanian female tennis players
Sportspeople from Brăila